Rosenfeld is a town in the Zollernalbkreis district of Baden-Württemberg, Germany.

History
Rosenfeld underwent a period of growth after World War II, beginning in the 1950s with new housing to the east of the town, and continuing into the 1980s with more residential, commercial, and industrial areas.

Geography
Elevation above sea level varies in the municipal area from a low of  Normalnull (NN) to a high of  NN.

The Federally-protected  and  nature reserves are located within the municipal area.

Coat of arms
Rosenfeld's municipal coat of arms displays a five-petaled, white rose with gold seeds and green sepals on a field of red. This pattern, in use by the town of Rosenfeld since 1372, was approved for official use by the Zollernalb district office on 11 May 1976.

Citations

External links
  (in German)

Towns in Baden-Württemberg